The Ingenheim derailment occurred on 5 March 2020 when a TGV train derailed near Ingenheim, Bas-Rhin, Grand Est, France, on the LGV Est rail line due to a landslip. Twenty-one of the 348 passengers on board were injured, along with the driver.

Accident
At 07:45 CET (06:45 UTC), a Colmar-Paris TGV train derailed between Ingenheim and Saessolsheim, Bas-Rhin, France. Euroduplex unit 4707 formed the train involved in the accident. The first five vehicles of the train were derailed. The train was carrying 348 passengers. Twenty-two people were injured, including the driver of the train, who was severely injured. He was airlifted to the Haute-Pierre Hospital in Strasbourg. Emergency service response included 102 gendarmes, 99 firefighters and 10 SAMU agents. Passengers were evacuated from the accident site by bus. The accident was caused by a landslip in a cutting affecting the track.

The line was closed following the accident, with services diverted. No cancellations of services were made as a result of the accident.

Investigation
The Strasbourg Public Prosecutor's Office opened an investigation into the accident. The Bureau d'Enquêtes sur les Accidents de Transport Terrestre (BEA-TT) is responsible for investigation of railway accidents in France.

See also
Eckwersheim derailment – 2015 TGV derailment in Bas-Rhin

References

21st century in Grand Est
Accidents and incidents involving SNCF
Derailments in France
February 2020 events in France
Railway accidents in 2020
TGV
Transport in Bas-Rhin